Slovenj Gradec Airport ( is an airport based in Slovenj Gradec and founded in 1937

History 
Beginning of sport aviation in Mislinja valley dates back in 1937. Since 1979 there is a new concrete runway which is 1200 meters long and 23 meters wide.

Aerodrom Slovenj Gradec Ltd. was established in 2002. Its main areas of work are aviation training, aviation maintenance, airplane sales and hotel management.

Aerodrom Slovenj Gradec Ltd. fulfils demands required by Slovenian CAA and works with Slovenian Air transportation Law. In winter 2002 the airport has begun with complete renovation of the airfield, including new hangar, new hotel, large parking area for 100 cars or 40 buses, modern air-petrol station etc.

Airports in Slovenia
Airports established in 1937
20th-century architecture in Slovenia